Jasenovac may refer to:

 Jasenovac concentration camp, a World War II concentration camp
 Jasenovac, Sisak-Moslavina County, a town and municipality in Croatia, the location of the Jasenovac concentration camp
 Jasenovac, Bosanski Petrovac, a village in the Una-Sana Canton in Bosnia and Herzegovina
 Jasenovac, Osijek-Baranja County, a village in the Kneževi Vinogradi municipality in Croatia
 Jasenovac Zagorski, a village in the Krapinske Toplice municipality in Croatia
 Mali Jasenovac, a village near Zaječar, Serbia
 Veliki Jasenovac, a village near Zaječar, Serbia

See also 
 Jasenov (disambiguation)
 Jasenovo (disambiguation)